Brent Franklin (born December 16, 1965) is a former Canadian professional golfer.

Early life
Franklin was born in Barrie, Ontario. He was coached in golf by Jack McLaughlin as a youth, and first came to prominence when he won the 1981 Vancouver City Match Play Championship as a 15-year-old amateur, to become the youngest champion ever in that event. The tournament is open to all professionals and top amateurs in the Lower Mainland region.

Career 
Franklin won the 1983 and 1984 Canadian Junior Championships. He earned a golf scholarship to Brigham Young University. He won the 1985 Alberta Amateur Championship.

Franklin then won three straight Canadian Amateur Championships, from 1985 to 1987. He was a member of the Canadian team which won the 1986 Eisenhower Trophy, the World Amateur Team Championship, in Venezuela, along with Warren Sye, Jack Kay Jr., and Mark Brewer.

Franklin earned three All-American selections in golf at BYU: 1985 Honorable Mention, 1986 First Team, and 1987 Second Team.

Franklin turned professional, and won the 1988 Canadian PGA Championship. That gave him a national championship in Canada at ever-rising levels for seven consecutive seasons. He was selected as Rookie of the Year on the 1988 Canadian Professional Golf Tour, and many thought he would become the next Canadian star on the PGA Tour.

Franklin then moved to the Japan Golf Tour for several years, and posted several strong finishes, including four runner-up results, earning very good prize money. He played 112 Japanese events between 1989 and 1995, and won a total of ¥140,307,935. He did not win a tournament. He lost a playoff to Masashi "Jumbo" Ozaki at the 1992 Dunlop Open.

Franklin was planning to move to the PGA Tour after 1995. But, when cycling in Vancouver, he was hit by a transport truck, and was seriously injured. Franklin was able to recover, and for a time played on the Canadian Professional Golf Tour, trying to regain his earlier form, but was never able to approach the level he had shown earlier.

Franklin was inducted into the Canadian Golf Hall of Fame in 2010.

Franklin currently works as a club professional in Colorado.

Amateur wins
1983 Canadian Junior Amateur, British Columbia Junior Boys, Vancouver and District Junior, Vancouver Match Play
1984 Canadian Junior Amateur, British Columbia Junior Boys
1985 Canadian Amateur Championship, Alberta Amateur
1986 Canadian Amateur Championship
1987 Canadian Amateur Championship

Professional wins (2)

Canadian Tour wins (2)

Playoff record
Japan Golf Tour playoff record (0–1)

Team appearances
this list may be incomplete

Amateur
Eisenhower Trophy (representing Canada): 1986 (winners)

Professional
World Cup (representing Canada): 1988, 1992
Dunhill Cup (representing Canada): 1992

References

External links

Canadian male golfers
BYU Cougars men's golfers
Japan Golf Tour golfers
Golfing people from Ontario
Golfing people from British Columbia
Sportspeople from Barrie
Sportspeople from Vancouver
Sportspeople from Calgary
1965 births
Living people